Baap Numbri Beta Dus Numbri is a 1990 Indian Hindi-language action comedy film directed by Aziz Sejawal and produced by Iqbal Baig. It stars Kader Khan, Shakti Kapoor in pivotal roles. Other cast includes Jackie Shroff, Farah, Aditya Pancholi, Sabeeha and Anjana Mumtaz. It was the 8th highest grossing Indian film of 1990.

Cast

 Kader Khan as Raman / Dayashankar "Daddu" (Double Role)
 Shakti Kapoor as Prasad
 Jackie Shroff as Ravi Singh / Ravi Dada
 Farah as Rosy D'Souza
 Aditya Pancholi as Anil
 Sabeeha as Anita Singh
 Gulshan Grover as Gullu Dada
 Asrani as Various character 
 Ram Sethi as Postman
 Vijay Arora as Custom Officer Pratap Singh
 Anjana Mumtaz as Gayatri Singh
Bharat Bhushan as Mr. D'Souza 
 Viju Khote as Orphaned Prisoner
 Yunus Parvez as Seth Bhogadmal
 Mushtaq Khan as Police Officer
 Satyen Kappu as School Master
 Mac Mohan as Goon
 Arun Bakshi as Goon
 Manik Irani as Kolhapuri Dada

Soundtrack

Awards
 Filmfare Award for Best Comedian - Kader Khan

Notes

References

External links

1990s Hindi-language films
1990 films
Films scored by Nadeem–Shravan
1990 action comedy films
Hindi films remade in other languages
Indian action comedy films
Indian films with live action and animation
Films directed by Aziz Sejawal